Love Everlasting (Italian: Ma l'amor mio non muore, more literally translated as But My Love Will Never Die) is a 1913 Italian silent drama film directed by Mario Caserini and starring Lyda Borelli, Mario Bonnard and Gianpaolo Rosmino. With the possible exception of Cabiria (1914), it is the most famous of early Italian silent films. It was made in Turin by Gloria Film. Borelli's appearance in the film led to her being considered the first diva of the cinema.

Cast
 Lyda Borelli as Elsa Holbein  
 Mario Bonnard as Prince Maximilien of Wallenstein  
 Gianpaolo Rosmino as Moise Sthar  
 Vittorio Rossi Pianelli as Col. Julius Holbein  
 Dante Cappelli as Granduke of Wallenstein  
 Maria Caserini as Granduchess of Wallenstein  
 Camillo De Riso as Schaudard  
 Emilio Petacci as Col. Theubner 
 Antonio Monti as General  
 Letizia Quaranta 
 Felice Metellio
 Gentile Miotti

References

Bibliography
 Doane, Mary Ann. Femmes Fatales. Routledge, 2013. 
 Moliterno, Gino. Historical Dictionary of Italian Cinema. Scarecrow Press, 2008.

External links

1913 films
Italian drama films
Italian silent feature films
1910s Italian-language films
Films directed by Mario Caserini
1913 drama films
Italian black-and-white films
Silent drama films